Taylorsville is a census-designated place (CDP) in Plumas County, California, United States. The population was 150 at the 2010 census, down from 154 at the 2000 census. The annual Stone Ranch Reunion is held in Taylorsville.

Geography
Taylorsville is located at  (40.073685, -120.838180).

Demographics

2010
The 2010 United States Census reported that Taylorsville had a population of 140. The racial makeup of Taylorsville was 131 (93.6%) White, 0 (0.0%) African American, 3 (2.1%) Native American, 0 (0.0%) Asian, 0 (0.0%) Pacific Islander, 0 (0.0%) from other races, and 6 (4.3%) from two or more races. Hispanic or Latino of any race were 1 persons (0.7%).

The Census reported that 140 people (100% of the population) lived in households, 0 (0%) lived in non-institutionalized group quarters, and 0 (0%) were institutionalized.

There were 71 households, out of which 12 (16.9%) had children under the age of 18 living in them, 28 (39.4%) were opposite-sex married couples living together, 5 (7.0%) had a female householder with no husband present, 4 (5.6%) had a male householder with no wife present.  There were 6 (8.5%) unmarried opposite-sex partnerships, and 0 (0%) same-sex married couples or partnerships. 30 households (42.3%) were made up of individuals, and 8 (11.3%) had someone living alone who was 65 years of age or older. The average household size was 1.97.  There were 37 families (52.1% of all households); the average family size was 2.62.

The population was spread out, with 25 people (17.9%) under the age of 18, 9 people (6.4%) aged 18 to 24, 25 people (17.9%) aged 25 to 44, 54 people (38.6%) aged 45 to 64, and 27 people (19.3%) who were 65 years of age or older.  The median age was 50.3 years. For every 100 females, there were 105.9 males.  For every 100 females age 18 and over, there were 105.4 males.

The homeowner vacancy rate was 0%; the rental vacancy rate was 4.5%.  92 people (65.7% of the population) lived in owner-occupied housing units and 48 people (34.3%) lived in rental housing units.

2000
As of the census of 2000, there were 154 people, 75 households, and 45 families residing in the CDP. The racial makeup of the CDP was 92.21% White, 0.65% Native American, 0.65% Asian, 0.65% from other races, and 5.84% from two or more races. Hispanic or Latino of any race were 1.95% of the population.

There were 75 households, out of which 21.3% had children under the age of 18 living with them, 50.7% were married couples living together, 6.7% had a female householder with no husband present, and 40.0% were non-families. 34.7% of all households were made up of individuals, and 16.0% had someone living alone who was 65 years of age or older. The average household size was 2.05 and the average family size was 2.62.

In the CDP, the population was spread out, with 17.5% under the age of 18, 7.8% from 18 to 24, 18.8% from 25 to 44, 33.8% from 45 to 64, and 22.1% who were 65 years of age or older. The median age was 47 years. For every 100 females, there were 77.0 males. For every 100 females age 18 and over, there were 84.1 males.

The median income for a household in the CDP was $23,194, and the median income for a family was $55,781. Males had a median income of $31,250 versus $25,577 for females. The per capita income for the CDP was $17,733. None of the families and 19.4% of the population were living below the poverty line, including no under eighteens and 41.5% of those over 64.

Politics

References

Census-designated places in Plumas County, California
Census-designated places in California